Abdel-Halim Nowera (died 1985) was an Egyptian conductor and impresario. In 1967 he founded the Arab Music Company (renamed the Abdel Halim Nowera Ensemble for Arabic Music after his death), a music ensemble dedicated to performing traditional Arab music like muwashshah and taktosha. The company has performed at music festivals and on tours internationally.

References

1985 deaths
Egyptian conductors (music)